Ibis del Carmen Gómez-Vega (born 20 December 1952) is a Cuban-American Latina novelist, short story writer, playwright, and literary critic. She is  an Associate Professor of Twentieth-Century American literature, Ethnic literature, American Drama, and Gay and Lesbian literature in the Department of English at Northern Illinois University.

Biography
Gómez-Vega was born in the back of a taxi cab Havana, Cuba, to Angela Vega-Gonzalez and Rodolfo Gómez-Oramas.  She attended the Colorado Women's College, between 1972–73.  Subsequently, she attended the University of Houston, where she earned her B.A. in 1976, M.A. in 1979, and Ph.D. in 1995.  Her dissertation was titled "The Journey Home: Caribbean Women Writers Face the Wreckage of History."  Gómez-Vega began teaching college courses as a graduate student at the University of Houston in 1978.  Since 1995, she has taught at Northern Illinois University in DeKalb, where she is an associate professor of English. She teaches Twentieth-Century American Literature, Ethnic Literature, American Drama, Gay and Lesbian Literature.

In addition to her creative writing, Gómez-Vega has contributed numerous articles, reviews, and essays to such publications as Intertexts, Voces: Journal of Chicana / Latina Studies, Journal of Political and Military Sociology, The Americas Review, MMLA: The Journal of the Midwest Modern Language Association, Crítica Hispánica, The Southern Quarterly, Alif: Journal of Comparative Poetics, and American Drama. She continues to write and perform readings from her works.

Publications

Novels
Send My Roots Rain.  San Francisco: Aunt Lute Press, 1991.

Short stories
"La Tortillera." The Bilingual Review 25.3 (2000): 306–314.
"Other People's Memories."  VOCES: A Journal of Chicana/Latina Studies 3.1&2 (2001): 254–271. Refereed.
"Telling Ribbons."  VOCES: A Journal of Chicana/Latina Studies 3.1&2 (2001): 272–292.
"Telling Ribbons." The Harrington Lesbian Fiction Quarterly 1.1 (1999): 41–61.
"Unnatural Acts." VOCES: A Journal of Chicana/Latina Studies 2.1 (1998): 23–41.

Plays
 Raise a Crow, given a staged reading by Theater Rhinoceros in San Francisco in 1985 and by At the Foot of the Mountain in Minneapolis in 1984.

References
 Biography - Gómez-Vega, Ibis (del Carmen)(1952-); Gale Reference Team, Contemporary Authors (Biography); Thomson Gale, 2004.

Further reading 
Sabiha Sorgun, "Seeing What Is Invisible to the Eye: Postmodern Spirituality in Ibis Gómez-Vega's Send My Roots Rain."  Crítica Hispánica 30.1-2 (2008): 174–91.
Troy-Smith, Jean.  "A Weave of Women in Send My Roots Rain by Ibis Gómez-Vega."  Called to Healing: Reflections on the Power of Earth's Stories in Women's Lives.  New York: State University of New York Press, 1996.  143–69.

External links
 Ibis Gómez-Vega at English Department Faculty and Staff.  Northern Illinois University

1952 births
Living people
20th-century American novelists
American women novelists
Colorado Women's College alumni
Cuban emigrants to the United States
University of Houston alumni
20th-century American women writers
21st-century American women